Bole is a small town and is the capital of Bole district, a district in the Savannah Region of northern Ghana. Bole is connected by road to the town of Sawla and the town of Bamboi. Bole is home to the Bole District Hospital and post office. The Bole District covers an area of 4800 km2 land mass and has a population of about 87,656 . The ex president of Ghana John Dramani Mahama is from this small town.

Institutions 

 Bole Senior High School
 Bole District Police Command
 Bole District Government Hospital
 Nkilgi FM

Climate

References 

Populated places in the Savannah Region (Ghana)